The 2023 Women's Premier League, also known as the TATA WPL 2023 for sponsorship reasons, is the ongoing inaugural season of the Women's Premier League, a women's franchise Twenty20 cricket league organised by the Board of Control for Cricket in India (BCCI). The tournament features five teams and is being held from 4 March to 26 March 2023.

Background
Tickets for matches are free to women during the first season. The opening ceremony took place on 4 March at DY Patil Stadium in Navi Mumbai, with AP Dhillon, Kriti Sanon and Kiara Advani performing.

Starting this season, both teams can use the Decision Review System to challenge no-ball and wide ball calls. The rule will be implemented in the upcoming 2023 IPL season.

Venues

Matches are being staged at the Brabourne Stadium in Mumbai and DY Patil Stadium in Navi Mumbai. The latter will host the final match.

Squads

Source:

2023 WPL player auction 
Below is list of the players sold during the WPL auction (prices are in Indian rupees). A total of 87 players were sold during the auction, 30 of whom were from overseas.

Points table

Matches

The BCCI released the fixture details on 14 February 2023.

Playoffs

Eliminator

Final

Statistics
Statistics are correct as of 19 March 2023.

Most runs 

  Orange Cap

Most wickets 

  Purple Cap

Broadcasting 
In India, Sports 18, Sports 18 Khel and Sports 18 1 HD are broadcasting the season on television and Jio Cinema streaming online. Sports 18 Khel and Jio Cinema are broadcasting Free-to-air. 

Source:

References

External links
 Tournament home at ESPN Cricinfo

Women's Premier League (cricket)
 Cricket in Mumbai
Women's Premier League
Premier League
 Sport in Navi Mumbai
Premier League
Premier League